Poltavka is a rural locality (a selo) in Dyachenkovskoye Rural Settlement, Bogucharsky District, Voronezh Oblast, Russia. The population was 523 as of 2010. There are 4 streets.

Geography 
Poltavka is located 8 km south of Boguchar (the district's administrative centre) by road. Kupyanka is the nearest rural locality.

References 

Rural localities in Bogucharsky District